Sing You Sinners is the seventh album by Erin McKeown since she began her career in 1997, and her fourth studio album in six years.  Released in 2006 via Nettwerk Records, it is an album of a variety of American standards, with one original composition, "Melody".

The album features Sam Kassirer on the piano, organ, and wurlitzer; Todd Sickafoose on the bass; and drummer Allison Miller. McKeown plays an array of banjos and guitars, as well as vocals.

Track listing
 Get Happy
 Paper Moon
 Coucou
 Melody
 They Say It's Spring
 I Was a Little Too Lonely (You Were a Little Too Late)
 Sing You Sinners
 Rhode Island is Famous for You
 Something's Gotta Give
 Just One of Those Things
 If You a Viper
 Thanks for the Boogie Ride
 Don't Worry 'bout Me

References

Erin McKeown albums